Kendra Leigh Wilkinson (formerly Baskett; born June 12, 1985) is an American television personality and model. She is known for being one of Hugh Hefner's girlfriends and for her role on the E! reality television series The Girls Next Door, on which her life in the Playboy Mansion was documented. Although not a Playboy Playmate, she has appeared in three nude pictorials with her Girls Next Door co-stars and fellow Hefner girlfriends Holly Madison and Bridget Marquardt. Her first reality series, Kendra, debuted in June 2009 and ended in November 2011. It was followed by Kendra on Top which ran on WE tv until 2017.

Early life
Born in San Diego, California, Wilkinson is of English, Irish, and Ukrainian descent. She has a younger brother named Colin. Her mother, Patti, was originally from Cherry Hill, New Jersey, and had been a cheerleader for the Philadelphia Eagles. Her father, Eric, was raised in Bryn Mawr, Pennsylvania and Ocean City, New Jersey, before moving to San Diego at age 15. He received a degree in biochemistry from the University of California, San Diego, and went on to found several biotechnology companies before retiring at the age of 48. Patti and Eric married on November 5, 1983. They divorced on March 25, 1994, when Kendra was eight years old. Her grandmother, Gloria Wilkinson, died in December 2004.

Wilkinson was raised in San Diego's Clairemont neighborhood, and played softball for six years with the Clairemont Bobby Sox. When she left high school, she began working as a glamour model, and also briefly worked as an administrative assistant in a dentist's office.

Career

2004–2009: Playboy and The Girls Next Door

Wilkinson met Hugh Hefner at his 78th birthday party in April 2004, where she appeared as one of the "painted girls" (women who are nude except for painted-on accessories). Hefner had seen a photo of her shot by Kim Riley on a fax machine at the Playboy Mansion and wanted to know who she was. Shortly after they met, Hefner asked Wilkinson to be one of his girlfriends, and he moved her into the Playboy Mansion In a 2014 interview, Wilkinson explained, "I was like, 'Hell yeah, I'm here!'. I was living in this small-ass apartment with this ugly-ass bitch. I was praying for anything to get me out of there. I moved in and weeks went by and I didn't know that sex was involved. I knew nothing about Playboy, I'd just graduated high school."

She was featured on the E! reality television series The Girls Next Door, which followed the lives of Hefner's then-girlfriends: Wilkinson, Holly Madison, and Bridget Marquardt. She moved out of the Playboy Mansion in 2009 after meeting her future husband, Hank Baskett, and filmed her own spin-off reality show for E! called Kendra. The first season was about her living on her own and planning her wedding.

Wilkinson has made several cameos on different programs such as Las Vegas and Entourage. She also appeared in Akon's music video "Smack That". While on the set of the video, Eminem poured a bottle of water on her head, though the two later reconciled. In 2006, she appeared in the Playboy Special Edition Sexy 100. In 2007, she appeared in Nickelback's music video of "Rockstar" along with Madison and Marquardt. They also had a cameo role in the 2006 film Scary Movie 4. Wilkinson also showed her creative side as a rapper on MTV's Celebrity Rap Superstar which debuted on August 30, 2007. She rapped to Ludacris' "Fantasy", in response to the question asked by the show's host, "Can Kendra move her mouth as fast as she moves her booty?" She went on to take second place, losing to Shar Jackson.

Wilkinson's stated career goal is to become a massage therapist or sports announcer. In December 2005, she became a regular blogger columnist on the website of the Philadelphia Eagles, a team for which her mother had been a professional cheerleader, and for which her husband played professionally.

2009–2011: Kendra, marriage, and motherhood

On August 13, 2008, the Wall Street Journal reported that Wilkinson was Olive Garden's "Biggest Celebrity Fan". Wilkinson has described Olive Garden's cuisine as "my soul food". The newspaper emphasized that her repeated enthusiastic public endorsements of the family restaurant were genuine, personal, and not tied to any payment from Olive Garden. In fact, the company was reported as viewing Wilkinson's endorsements with "mixed feelings", as well as something on which the restaurant was reluctant to comment, since it emphasizes a family-friendly nature.

On September 22, 2008, the International Business Times reported that Wilkinson was engaged to then-Philadelphia Eagles wide receiver Hank Baskett. Wilkinson initially denied this, but she later admitted she was in a relationship with him, on October 7, 2008, in an interview with Chelsea Handler on Chelsea Lately.

On November 6, 2008, E! Online announced Wilkinson and Baskett were engaged, after he had proposed the previous Saturday at the Space Needle in Seattle, Washington.

Wilkinson married Baskett on June 27, 2009, at the Playboy Mansion. Although it was initially announced that Hugh Hefner would give the bride away, Kendra's brother Colin walked her down the aisle. Wilkinson's family was in attendance, as well as former Girls Next Door stars Holly Madison and Bridget Marquardt. On the wedding episode of Kendra, she said that she would be taking Baskett's last name. They lived in Calabasas, California.

On June 11, 2009, Wilkinson announced her first pregnancy. The baby, a boy, was born in December 2009. Wilkinson's friends hosted a baby shower on September 9, 2009. She told E! News that Hefner would be the child's godfather. but later denied this.

She attributed her depression to moving to Indianapolis, where her husband played so soon after the birth, and feeling isolated.

Wilkinson starred in a spinoff of Girls Next Door, titled Kendra, which focused on her life after leaving the Playboy Mansion and getting engaged. The Girls Next Door executive producer Kevin Burns served in the same capacity on the series. Kendra was produced by Prometheus Entertainment, Fox TV Studios, and Alta Loma Entertainment. Kendra premiered on June 7, 2009, and had record breaking numbers for E! with 2.6 million viewers, making it the highest-rated reality debut for the network since 2002's premiere of The Anna Nicole Show. The show's 33rd and final episode, the third-season finale, debuted on January 9, 2011. The show was not renewed for a fourth season.

In 2007, Wilkinson appeared on an episode of WWE Raw with Bridget Marquardt.

In 2010, Kendra published a memoir, Sliding Into Home.

Wilkinson was a contestant in the twelfth season of Dancing with the Stars, partnered with Louis Van Amstel. She was eliminated in the seventh week on May 3, 2011. Kendra launched her personal website KendraWilkinson.com in November 2011. The digital community offers space for Kendra to answer all her fans questions, and connect with each other while talking about family, friends and laughter.

On March 17, 2010, Wilkinson's E! True Hollywood Story premiered on E!. During the hour-long episode, she discussed her rocky road to stardom. In May 2010, a video recording of Wilkinson having sex with a then-unidentified man surfaced. The recording was acquired by Vivid Entertainment, who planned to distribute the tape as Kendra Exposed. Wilkinson contested the release and threatened to sue should it be released. RadarOnline reported that in 2008, Wilkinson herself set up a company Home Run Productions LLC, through which she made several attempts to sell sex tapes. Sources have reported that Wilkinson was paid $680,000 for the film that was made by her high school boyfriend Justin Frye when she was 18.

2012–present: Kendra on Top and divorce
After parting ways with E! in 2011, Wilkinson and her family started a new reality show on WE tv, Kendra on Top. It premiered June 5, 2012. The show ended in 2017.

On February 26, 2013, Wilkinson appeared on an episode of Celebrity Wife Swap with Kate Gosselin. On April 20, 2013, she was involved in another automobile accident on a California freeway. Her injuries included having a minor hemorrhagic stroke. On October 31, 2013, Wilkinson announced that she was pregnant with her second child. She gave birth to a daughter in May 2014.

In November 2014, Wilkinson was a contestant on the 14th series of the British reality TV series hit I'm a Celebrity...Get Me Out of Here!, finishing in sixth place.

On April 28, 2017, Kendra, Baskett and her mother were one of the families featured on the WE reality show Marriage Bootcamp: Family Edition.

On April 6, 2018, she filed for divorce from Hank Baskett, seeking restoration of her maiden name in the process.

On November 17th, 2021, Discovery+ premiered her next reality  series, Kendra Sells Hollywood, which covers her new career as a real estate agent in Los Angeles.  It was renewed for a second season on February 3, 2022.

References

External links

 

1985 births
Female models from California
Living people
Participants in American reality television series
People from San Diego
American people of Irish descent
American people of English descent
American people of Ukrainian descent
I'm a Celebrity...Get Me Out of Here! (British TV series) participants
21st-century American women